InterWay Company Ltd., is a software company that was founded in 1997. It works in the area of web domains constructions including eCommerce or intranet portals. In 2001 has developed its original tool for Web Content Management - WebJET CMS. As one of the first companies in Slovakia decided to use SOA /Service oriented architecture/.

History in numbers 
 1997 - was established the company
 2001 - was developed the Web Content Management System
 2006 - was developed original eLearning tool
 2008 - ranked at 36th place EMEA Technology Fast and at 10th place in Central Europe Technology Fast 50
 2009 - was developed original Document Management System

References 

Software companies of Slovakia